Moussa Abdelmadjid Tahraoui Douma (born February 24, 1981, in Chlef) is an Algerian professional footballer. He is currently unattached after last playing for Asswehly S.C. in the Libyan Premier League.

Club career
In the summer of 2005, Tahraoui joined USM Blida on a transfer from ASO Chlef. At the time, the transfer fee of 12,5 million Algerian dinars (€138,500) paid by USM Blida was the highest fee paid between two Algerian clubs.

International career
On August 17, 2004, Tahraoui made his debut for the Algerian National Team in a friendly against Burkina Faso. He started the match and scored a goal in the 33rd minute. He was subbed off at halftime for Salim Arrache.

International goals
Scores and results list Algeria's goal tally first.

References

External links
 
 

1981 births
Living people
People from Chlef
Algerian footballers
Algeria international footballers
Algerian expatriate footballers
Expatriate footballers in Libya
ASO Chlef players
USM Blida players
MC Alger players
MC Oran players
OMR El Annasser players
Algerian expatriate sportspeople in Libya
Asswehly S.C. players
Association football forwards
Libyan Premier League players
21st-century Algerian people